FECH may refer to:
Ferrochelatase
Student Federation of the University of Chile

See also
Fech